Robert Anton Young III (November 27, 1923 – October 17, 2007) was a Democratic politician from the state of Missouri who served five terms in the US House of Representatives.

Education and family background
Young was the oldest child in a family that grew to include nine children.  He was educated in parochial schools in St. Louis County.  He attended McBride High School and graduated from Normandy High School in 1941.

He married Irene Slawson on November 27, 1947, and they were married for fifty years, until her death in 1997.  Their family includes three children, Anne, Peggy, and Robert.  
Nine grandchildren, Matthew, Kevin, Katie, Jason, Megan, Robert, John, Blake, and Teresa, and ten great-grandchildren, Robert, Chelsie, Morgan, Kennedy, Kendall, Cydney, Tegan, Cameron, and Kaiden. Young was a union pipefitter by trade, a member of Pipefitters and Plumbers Local 562, AFL-CIO, St. Louis, until his election to Congress in 1976.

Military service
Young served in the U.S. Army from  February 1943 to November 1945. His unit landed "under fire" on Utah Beach, on  D-Day, June 6, 1944.  He then served in General George Patton's 3rd Army in the Battle of the Bulge. He was awarded the Bronze Star for valor in combat, the African-European Campaign Medal with Five Battlestars,  the Combat Infantryman Badge, and the French Croix-de-Guerre with Palm for D-Day.

Political career
Young's long political career began in 1952 with his election as Democratic Committeeman for Airport Township in St. Louis County, an office he held until 1977.  He was elected to the Missouri House of Representatives in 1956 and served there for 6 years.  In 1962, he was elected to the Missouri State Senate, and served for 14 years.

During his years in the State Legislature, Young supported legislation that created the St. Louis Junior College District and helped establish the University of Missouri–St. Louis.  The St. Louis Globe-Democrat awarded him its Award for Meritious Service to his state three times, 1972, 1974, and 1976.

In 1976, Young was elected to the United States House of Representatives representing the Second Congressional District of Missouri. As a member of Congress, he served on several key committees including Public Works and Transportation, Aviation, Water Resources, and Science and Technology.

Young was reelected without serious difficulty in 1978 and 1980.  However, after the 1980 census, Young's district was significantly altered as a result of Missouri losing a congressional district.  He lost his share of St. Louis, and was instead pushed into more conservative territory to the west.  Although he took 56 percent in 1982, he was nearly defeated by Republican State Representative Jack Buechner in 1984 as Ronald Reagan took almost 60 percent of the vote in his district.  Young faced Buechner again in 1986, and this time lost by 7,400 votes.

Young was a strong proponent of public works projects to benefit his district and the state of Missouri. The St. Louis Construction News and Review and Pride, Inc. named Young "Construction Industry Man of the Year" in 1981.  Among the projects he supported were landscaping the Gateway Arch, renovation of the Old Post Office, the creation of the light-rail mass transit MetroLink system, the construction of the Thomas F. Eagleton Federal Courthouse, the expansion of Lambert Airport,  and the new Lock and Dam 26 at Alton, Illinois.

Retirement
After his retirement from public office, Young remained active and involved in community affairs.   He  was a  life member of Amvets, VFW, and was an active member of American Legion Post 338 in Overland, Missouri.  He also served on the Board of the James S. McDonnell USO and was a member of the St. Louis Airport Commission.

Awards and honors
In 1988, President Ronald Reagan designated the Federal Building in downtown St. Louis as the "Robert A. Young Federal Building" in Young's honor.

Other awards and honors he has received include:

The John H. Poelker Transportation Progress Award by the RCGA Board of Directors
Honorary Doctor of Humanities from the Logan School of Chiropractic
The "Able Helmsman" of the Year by the Greater St. Louis Port Council
Dean's Award from the University of Missouri, St. Louis
St. Louis County Historical Society "Father Faherty" Award, 1992
Thomas Jefferson Award from the St. Louis County Democrats, 2001

Death
Young died on October 17, 2007, due to liver disease.

External links

 Robert A. Young Papers (1974-1986) in the Western Historical Manuscript Collection, University of Missouri-St. Louis
 

1923 births
2007 deaths
United States Army personnel of World War II
United States Army soldiers
Deaths from liver disease
Democratic Party members of the United States House of Representatives from Missouri
20th-century American politicians
Politicians from St. Louis
Military personnel from St. Louis